G 1/13 is a decision issued on 25 November 2014 by the Enlarged Board of Appeal of the European Patent Office (EPO), holding that in opposition proceedings a retroactive effect of a restoration of a company must be recognised by the EPO. In other words, a restoration of a company has retroactive effect before the EPO when it has such retroactive effect under national law.

Questions referred to the Enlarged Board of Appeal
The referral to the Enlarged Board of Appeal lies from an interlocutory decision T 22/09  from Technical Board of Appeal 3.3.07. The referred questions were:

Answers to the referred questions
The Enlarged Board of Appeal answered these questions as follows:

References

Further reading 
: "Opposition procedure - entitlement to file an opposition - general"
: "Opposition procedure - entitlement to file an opposition - examination at any state in the proceedings of entitlement to oppose"
: "Procedural status of the parties - parties to appeal proceedings"
: "Procedural status of the parties - existence of a company"
: "Referral by a board of appeal - general"
: "Referral by a board of appeal - point of law of fundamental importance"

External links 
 G 0001/13 of 25.11.2014
 Decision G 1/13, Official Journal EPO 4/2015, A42
Decision T 22/09 (Party status/Fischer-Tropsch Catalysts/SASOL TECHNOLOGY) of 21 June 2013 (referring decision)

G 2013 1
2014 in case law
2014 in Europe
Jurisdiction